Seaquest State Park is a public recreation area located on the western flank of Silver Lake in Cowlitz County, Washington. The  state park is home to the Mount St. Helens Visitor Center, which offers displays on the Mount St. Helens volcanic eruption of 1980.

Activities and amenities
Park activities include camping,  of hiking trails (including  of ADA-accessible trail), picnicking, bird watching, and horseshoes. The park has a mile-long shoreline on Silver Lake, a shallow lowland lake with wetlands trail and boardwalk, boat launch, and fishing.

References

External links

Seaquest State Park Washington State Parks and Recreation Commission 
Seaquest State Park Map Washington State Parks and Recreation Commission

State parks of Washington (state)
Parks in Cowlitz County, Washington
Protected areas established in 1945